The Nairobi Expressway is a  toll road in Kenya, connecting Jomo Kenyatta International Airport  to Nairobi's Westlands area, that has been  constructed under a public-private partnership between the government of Kenya and China Road and Bridge Corporation (CRBC).

Location
The 27.1-kilometer road starts from Mlolongo passing through JKIA and Nairobi’s CBD to the James Gichuru junction along Waiyaki Way. From Mlolongo, the road links up via an interchange with Airport South Road, to Jomo Kenyatta International Airport, along the Nairobi-Mombasa Road.

Overview
The Nairobi Expressway is aimed at easing traffic and provide a seamless access to the  Jomo Kenyatta International Airport and it's environs. The work involves expansion of the existing road to four-lanes one-way, (8 lanes total), with foot paths, drainage channels, overpass bridges and street lighting.

Construction and funding
The government of Kenya has contracted with China Road and Bridge Corporation (CRBC) to build this toll road on a public-private partnership (PPP) basis. CRBC will use their own money to construct the road expansion, interchanges and toll stations. They will collect the toll fees until their investment is recovered, then the road will revert to government.

The road expansion is to be done in stages. The World Bank had indicated interest in funding the road expansion, but those plans have been overtaken by events. The cost of the toll highway is quoted as between KSh51 billion (US$510 million) and KSh65 billion (US$650 million).

Recent events
In April 2022, 98.4 Capital FM reported that the construction of the expressway was complete and was awaiting political and commercial commissioning. The road project which cost over US$560 million to build, is expected to reduce travel time from Jomo Kenyatta International Airport (JKIA) to the Nairobi central business district to between 15 and 20 minutes, instead of the two hours it took, before the expressway was built.

See also
 List of roads in Kenya
 A104 road (Kenya)
 Transport in Kenya

References

External links
 Webpage of the Kenya National Highway Authority

Roads in Kenya
Geography of Kenya
Transport in Kenya
Nairobi
Kiambu County